The term interdiscipline or inter-discipline means an organizational unit that involves two or more academic disciplines, but which have the formal criteria of disciplines such as dedicated research journals, conferences and university departments. It is related to interdisciplinarity, but it is a noun used for a certain kind of unit (academic discipline). As shown in the example of demography below a field may be both a discipline and an interdiscipline at the same time. The example of Information science demonstrates that a field may be regarded as a discipline in some countries but an interdiscipline in other countries.

Conceptions
Giesecke (1981) says about educational research ("pedagogy") that is an "aporetic science", i.e. an interdiscipline.

Tengström (1993) emphases that cross-disciplinary research is a process, not a state or structure. He differentiates three levels of ambition regarding cross-disciplinary research:

The pluridisciplinary or multidisciplinarity level
The genuine cross-disciplinary level: interdisciplinarity
The discipline-forming level transdisciplinarity

What is described here is a view of social fields as dynamic and changing. Library and information science is viewed as a field that started as a multidisciplinary approach based on literature, psychology, sociology, management, computer science etc., which is developing towards an academic discipline in its own right.

Examples
Biosemiotics
Cryptography
Demography
"As a field with its own body of interrelated concepts, techniques, journals, and professional associations, demography is clearly a discipline. But by the nature of its subject matter and methods demography is just as clearly an 'interdiscipline', drawing heavily on biology and sociology for the study of fertility; on economics and geography for studies of migration; and on the health sciences for the study of mortality." (Stycos, 1989, vii).

Forensic Kinesiology
Genetic toxicology
Humor and translation
Information science
In America information science and communication studies are considered two academic disciplines. In France, however, they are considered one interdiscipline. (See also).

Planetary science
Public health
Social science in agriculture
Sociolinguistics

See also
 Academic discipline

Literature
 

Academia
Pedagogy